Jordon Brown (born 28 November 1992) is a Scottish professional footballer who plays as a midfielder for Peterhead.

Career 
Brown came through the youth system at Aberdeen and played for the club at under-17 and under-19 levels. He signed a professional full-time contract in June 2009. In January 2010, he scored one goal and set up another for the Aberdeen under-19s in a 4–0 friendly match win over the Málaga CF youth side in Spain.
For the 2010–11 season, he was given squad number 41. He was an unused substitute in four SPL matches that season and played in the Aberdeenshire Cup, in which he scored against Highland League club Cove Rangers in the quarter finals on 19 August 2010.

In Aberdeen's first pre-season friendly in advance of the 2011–12 season, which was against Scottish Second Division side Brechin City on 30 June 2011, Jordon made an appearance as a 76th-minute substitute for trialist Patrick Bengondo in a 3–1 victory. He made substitute appearances for the first team in three other pre-season friendlies in July 2011; a 5–2 defeat to Bundesliga side Borussia Mönchengladbach, an 11–1 victory over Highland Football League neighbours Inverurie Locos and a 1–0 loss to La Liga team Villareal.

For the 2011–12 season, Jordon was given squad number 26. On 15 September 2011, he went on loan to Forfar Athletic. He scored both goals for Forfar in his first game for the club, a 2–0 friendly win against Dundee on 22 September 2011. His Scottish Football League debut came when he was a second-half substitute in a 2–0 home defeat to Dumbarton on 24 September 2011. Jordon was unable to play any further matches in the 2011–12 season after suffering a cruciate ligament injury in the first minute of a match against Cowdenbeath on 22 October 2011.

He was given the squad number 24 for Aberdeen in the 2012–13 season. He made his Scottish Premier League debut for the club as a substitute in a 3–1 win at Kilmarnock on 6 October 2012. On 23 January 2013, he returned to Forfar Athletic on loan until the end of the season.

Jordon was released by Aberdeen at the end of the 2012–13 season and signed a deal with Peterhead. He scored 2 goals against his former side in a 3–2 friendly win.

In summer 2018, Brown signed for Highland League club Cove Rangers. In one of his first appearances, a friendly against Aberdeen to mark the opening of Cove's new stadium, he suffered a serious head injury and the match was abandoned.

Brown returned to Peterhead in December 2020.

Personal life
Brown's younger brother Jason is also a footballer, who played for Peterhead since 2017 having begun his career in the youth system at Inverness Caledonian Thistle.

Career statistics

References

External links 
 Jordon Brown profile – Aberdeen F.C. website

1992 births
Scottish Premier League players
Scottish footballers
Association football midfielders
Aberdeen F.C. players
Living people
Footballers from Aberdeen
Peterhead F.C. players
Cove Rangers F.C. players
Scottish Professional Football League players
Highland Football League players